John Neil Bell (October 4, 1921 – August 17, 1998) was a Canadian football player who played for the Regina/Saskatchewan Roughriders from 1946 to 1952. He played junior football for the Parkdale Lions. In 1998, he was inducted into the Roughriders' Plaza of Honour. He died earlier that year of a heart condition, aged 76.

References

1921 births
1998 deaths
Canadian football ends
Saskatchewan Roughriders players
Players of Canadian football from Quebec
Canadian football people from Montreal